Silur is the second full-length release by Tarwater, an electronic music group from Berlin, Germany. The album debuted on September 28, 1998.  The album combines spartan spoken-word narration with ambient, electronic music.  The music mainly consists of looped samples layered with live instruments.  The instruments used were not those commonly used in pop-rock music.  For example, the flute is commonly used throughout the album.

The album received some criticism for failing to maintain the same tone consistently throughout the album.  The first five songs feature a slow, deliberate, almost ethereal tone.  The mood is interrupted by the sixth song, "No More Extra Time," an up-tempo synth-pop song.  The album's seventh song reverts to the mood of the first five, however subsequent songs are progressively more pop-like than ambient.

Track listing 
"Visit"
"To Moauf"
"The Watersample"
"Seafrance Cezanne"
"Silur"
"No More Extra Time"
"Otomo"
"Ford"
"The Pomps of the Subsoil"
"20 Miles Up"
"To Describe You"
"Chaos"

References

1998 albums
Tarwater (band) albums